Marvin Golden (born 21 December 1976) is an English former professional rugby league footballer who played in the 1990s and 2000s.

Background
Marvin Golden was born in Leeds, West Yorkshire, England, he now works for TRAD Safety Systems located in Morley, West Yorkshire, England.

References

External links
(archived by web.archive.org) SL stats
(archived by web.archive.org) Profile at Leeds Rhinos Official Site

1976 births
Living people
Bramley RLFC players
Doncaster R.L.F.C. players
English rugby league players
Halifax R.L.F.C. players
Leeds Rhinos players
London Broncos players
People from Rothwell, West Yorkshire
Rugby league centres
Rugby league players from Leeds
Rugby league wingers
Widnes Vikings players